Smokey Joe, Smokey Joe's or Smoky Joe's may refer to:

Nickname
 Joe Barton, Texan Congressman, nicknamed "Smokey Joe" for defending industries against pollution controls
 Smokey Joe Baugh (1932–1999), American rockabilly musician
 Happy Finneran (1890–1942), American Major League Baseball pitcher
 Joe Martin (third baseman) (1911–1960), American Major League Baseball player
 Smokey Robinson (born 1940), American singer, songwriter, record producer and former record executive whose childhood nickname was "Smokey Joe"
 Joe Salem (American football) (born 1938), American former college football player and coach
 Charlie Teagarden (1913–1984), American jazz trumpeter
 Smokey Joe Williams (1886–1951), American baseball pitcher in the Negro leagues, member of the Baseball Hall of Fame
 Smoky Joe Wood (1889–1985), American baseball player

Other uses
 Smokey Joe (video game), a variant of the 1978 arcade game Fire Truck
 Smokey Joe (model locomotive), a model steam locomotive built by Hornby Railways
 Smoky Joe's, a former men's clothing store and current website
 "Smokey Joe", nickname given to Soviet World War II freighter Sukhona by another ship's crew in Convoy QP 1

See also
 Smoking Joe (disambiguation) or Smokin' Joe, a nickname 
 "Smokey Joe's Cafe", a song by The Robins
 Smokey Joe's Cafe (revue)
 Smokey Joe's Cafe: Direct from Broadway, a 2000 film 

Lists of people by nickname